Ernestas Ežerskis (born 5 May 1987 in Panevėžys, Lithuanian SSR) is a Lithuanian professional basketball player, for Lietkabelis Panevėžys of the Lithuanian Basketball League, but on loan for BC Ežerūnas of the National Basketball League (Lithuania) . He plays the point guard position.

Career
In September 2007, Ežerskis joined KR of the Icelandic Úrvalsdeild karla on loan from Lietuvos Rytas. His first game with KR was against Snæfell in the Icelandic Company Cup finals where he scored 3 points. In his next game, during Icelandic Super Cup where he went scoreless in 9 minutes of playing time. His best game, and ultimately his last game for KR, came against Fjölnir in the Úrvalsdeild karla where he scored 15 points in 19 minutes. After the game he left KR and returned to Rytas.

References

External links 
 LKL profile
 FIBA profile
 EuroBasket profile
 Úrvalsdeild karla statistics

1987 births
Living people
BC Juventus players
BC Lietkabelis players
BC Neptūnas players
BC Nevėžis players
BC Prienai players
BC Rytas players
BK Liepājas Lauvas players
Jämtland Basket players
KR men's basketball players
Lithuanian expatriate basketball people in Iceland
Lithuanian men's basketball players
Point guards
Rapla KK players
Sportspeople from Panevėžys
Universiade bronze medalists for Lithuania
Universiade medalists in basketball
Úrvalsdeild karla (basketball) players
Lithuanian expatriate basketball people in Estonia
Medalists at the 2011 Summer Universiade